Sloss can refer to:

People
 Bruce Sloss (1889–1917), Australian Rules footballer, killed in action in World War I
 Daniel Sloss, Scottish comedian, actor and writer
 Elizabeth Butler-Sloss, President of the Family Division of the UK's family law system
 James Sloss, founder of Sloss Furnaces
 Louis Sloss (1823–1902), partner in the Alaska Commercial Company
 M. C. Sloss, American judge in California
 Peter Sloss, Scottish meteorologist and broadcaster for BBC Scotland

Other
 Sloss, California, a former town in Mariposa County
 Sloss Furnaces, a National Historic Landmark in Birmingham, Alabama
 Sloss Industries, a subsidiary of Walter Industries, Inc.
 Sloss Nature Reserve, a protected reserve in Western Australia
 The SLOSS debate regarding biodiversity in conservation planning
 The SS Louis Sloss, a Liberty ship